Klim is a masculine given name, sometimes a diminutive form of Kliment. It is borne by:

 Klim Churyumov (1937–2016), Soviet and Ukrainian astronomer
 Klim Gavrilov (born 2000), Russian race car driver
 Klim Kostin (born 1999), Russian ice hockey player
 Klim Prykhodko (born 2000), Ukrainian footballer
 Klim Shipenko (born 1983), Russian film director, screenwriter, actor and producer
 Kliment Voroshilov (1881–1969), Soviet officer and politician, Marshal of the Soviet Union and Chairman of the Presidium of the Supreme Soviet
 Klim Savur, pseudonym of Dmytro Klyachkivsky (1911–1945), a commander of the Ukrainian Insurgent Army during World War II
 the title character of The Life of Klim Samgin, a four-volume novel by Maxim Gorky

Masculine given names